Maaskant is a Dutch surname. Notable people with the surname include:

Hugh Maaskant (1907–1977), Dutch architect
Martijn Maaskant (born 1983), Dutch cyclist
Robert Maaskant (born 1969), Dutch footballer and manager

Dutch-language surnames